Rock with Bill Haley and the Comets is the title of an early rock and roll music compilation album issued by Essex Records (ESLP 202) in December 1955, and featuring music by the titular group, Bill Haley & His Comets. The album features recordings made by Haley in 1952 and 1953, including his hits, "Rock the Joint", "Crazy Man Crazy" (Billboard, #12, Cashbox, #11), "Fractured" (Billboard, #24), and "Live It Up" (Billboard, #25).

Content
All the songs on Rock with Bill Haley and the Comets were previously released as singles under the Essex banner, including several that were originally released when the band used the name Bill Haley and the Saddlemen. The album does not include any of the tracks Haley and the Comets recorded in 1954 before moving to Decca, nor are any of the tracks from 1951-52 included that Haley recorded for Essex's sister label, Holiday Records (although later releases of Haley's Essex label work would include these tracks).

Essex leased this album out to numerous other labels that subsequently issued it under their own brand. This includes Somerset Records, Paragon Records, Reo Records, Transworld, and Quality Records. The album was released in the UK in 1962 by Pye Golden Guinea Records under the title Rock the Joint.

Track listing
 "Rock the Joint" (Harry Crafton, Wendell Keane, Harry Bagby)
 "Rockin' Chair on the Moon" (Bill Haley, Harry Broomall)
 "Farewell, So Long, Goodbye" (Bill Haley)
 "Real Rock Drive" (Bill Haley)
 "Fractured" (Bill Haley, Marshall Lytle)
 "Stop Beatin' Round the Mulberry Bush" (Bickley Reichner, Clay Boland)
 "Crazy Man Crazy" (Bill Haley)
 "Pat-a-Cake" (Billy Williamson, Bill Haley)
 "Live It Up" (Bill Haley)
 "What'cha Gonna Do" (Bill Haley)
 "I'll Be True" (William McLemore)
 "Dance with a Dolly" (Terry Shand, Jimmy Eaton, Mickey Leader)

Personnel
The Comets
 Bill Haley – rhythm guitar, vocals
 Billy Williamson – steel guitar
 Johnny Grande – piano; organ on 11
 Marshall Lytle – double bass
 Dick Richards - backing vocals on 9 11

Additional musicians
 Danny Cedrone – lead guitar on 1 2 4 6 12
 Art Ryerson - lead guitar on 3 5 7 8 9 10 11 
 Billy Gussak – drums on 3 4 5 6 7 8 9 10
 Cliff Leeman - drums on 11
 Tony Lance - baritone saxophone on 3 9 11
 Dave Miller - clapboard on 11, backing vocals on 7 

Note: no drums were used on tracks 1, 2, 12. According to the Haley biography Sound and Glory by John W. Haley and John von Hoelle (Dyne-American, 1990), numerous other individuals participated on backing vocals on 7, including record executive Jerry Blaine.

External links
 Bill Haley discography

Bill Haley & His Comets albums
1954 compilation albums
Essex Records compilation albums
Albums produced by Dave Miller (producer)